The discography of Maraaya, a Slovenian duo, consists of ten singles. They represented Slovenia at the 2015 Eurovision Song Contest in Vienna, Austria, with the song "Here for You", coming fourteenth in the final with 39 points.

Singles

As lead artist

As featured artists

Other charted songs

References 

Discographies of Slovenian artists